Mehndi Tere Naam Ki was a Hindi television drama series that aired on Zee TV channel from 15 March 2000 to 18 September 2002 on every Wednesday at 8:30 P.M.. The show was produced by popular Bollywood actress Aruna Irani. Because of its popularity among audiences, the show was nominated for numerous award categories by the Indian Telly Awards (2002): Anand Raj Anand was nominated for the TV Music Director of The Year award and Asif Shaikh was nominated for the TV Actor in a Negative Role award for his character Raj.

Plot
As the title name of the series suggests, the story highlights the typical Indian dilemmas regarding matrimony. The story revolves around the life of Jayant Malik and Sharda Malik who are having major difficulties finding the best matches for their four unmarried daughters. The strange thing is that although Mrs. Malik is a matchmaker and has arranged countless matches, she is unable to find the best suited boys for her own daughters. The family goes through many trials and tribulation until all of the girls settle down.

Cast 
 Aruna Irani as Sharda Jayant Malik
 Satyen Kappu as Jayant Malik 
 Sangeeta Ghosh as Muskaan Malik
 Meenakshi Gupta as Kajal Malik
 Purbi Joshi as Niharika (Nikki) Malik
 Urvashi Dholakia as Pooja Malik
 Amar Upadhyay as Akshat
 Nasir Khan / Manish Goel as Aman
 Siddharth Dhawan as Rahul
 Yatin Karyekar as Rahul's Father
 Raman Kapoor as Nikhil
 Pooja Ghai Rawal
 Aasif Sheikh as Raj
 Sanjeev Seth as Akash
 Swati Chitnis as Savita
 Arun Bakshi
 Neelam Mehra
 Manjeet Kullar as Meeta Raheja
 Yusuf Hussain as Akshat's Grandfather

References

External links

Indian television soap operas
Zee TV original programming
2000 Indian television series debuts
2002 Indian television series endings